Hvannadalshnjúkur (pronounced ) or Hvannadalshnúkur  is a pyramidal peak on the northwestern rim of the summit crater of the Öræfajökull volcano in Vatnajökull National Park, Iceland.  Its summit is the highest point in the country.

Geography 

The peak is part of the Vatnajökull National Park.

Access to the summit 
The route to the top is a popular climb through numerous and frequently hidden crevasses, and, because of this, the climb calls for experienced mountain guides.

Gallery

See also
 List of islands by highest point
 List of European ultra prominent peaks

Notes

References

External links

 "Hvannadalshnjúkur, Iceland" on Peakbagger
 Official Website of Vatnajökull National Park

Southern Region (Iceland)
Mountains of Iceland
Highest points of countries
Two-thousanders of Iceland